The Industrial Christian Home for Polygamous Wives (or The Industrial Christian Home) was a women's refuge created in 1886 in Salt Lake City. Due to several conflicts, including low occupancy, the facility closed in 1893. The building was subsequently used as the seat of the Utah State Legislature, as a hotel, as officer's quarters in WW2, then finally as a private club until it was demolished in 1985.

History
The Industrial Christian Home Association was founded by Angelia Thurston Newman ("Angie") in March 1886. Newman, a member of the Women's Christian Temperance Union, was a resident of Nebraska when she became aware of polygamy in Utah while visiting relatives there in 1876. She was determined to provide a safe haven for women in polygamous marriages, and by 1883 had financial backing from the Methodist Episcopal Woman's Home Missionary Society. When she eventually parted ways with the missionary society, Newman teamed up with women who were largely Protestant and ex-members of the defunct Ladies Anti-Polygamy Society (or the Womans National Anti-polygamy Society), including among their number the active Jennie Anderson Froiseth, editor of The Anti-Polygamy Standard.

Representing the group before the Senate Committee on Education and Labor in Washington D. C., Newman applied for federal funds and was successful in securing an initial $40,000. The Industrial Christian Home opened in a temporary location in December 1886, overseen by a Congressionally appointed "Board of Control" (the Utah Commission), headed by territorial governors Eli H. Murray and Caleb Walton West. A dispute ensued when the women challenged who should administer the financial oversight. Newman appealed for intervention directly to President Grover Cleveland, who delegated the request to the Secretary of the Interior.

Difficulties between the board and the staff caused organizational problems, which were exacerbated by Mormon attempts to discredit the whole enterprise.  A total of 154 applications were made in the first nine months, most of which were refused by the board, who reasoned that monogamous wives, first wives, and children of polygamists would not be helped by the home. Mission staff restricted access to those whose marriages they considered illegal – second and third wives.  Also excluded were those who refused polygamy, or indeed Mormonism as a whole.

In 1888–1889 Congress approved funds for an elaborate new home.  An additional appropriation of $80,000 ($75,000 for building and $5,000 for contingent expenses) paid for the construction of a large building at 145 South 500 East in Salt Lake City.  The home opened in June 1889. It never had enough residents to fill its capacious accommodation. It closed in 1893.

Later uses of the building
Briefly the building was the home of the Utah legislature.   Afterwards it became a residential hotel – the Fifth East Hotel.  During World War II it housed military officers.

In 1945 it became the Ambassador Athletic Club.

The building was demolished in 1985.

See also
 Mormonism and polygamy

References

External links
 

1886 establishments in Utah Territory
Buildings and structures completed in 1889
1893 disestablishments in the United States
Organizations disestablished in 1893
Buildings and structures demolished in 1985

Buildings and structures in Salt Lake City
Mormonism and polygamy
Women's shelters in the United States
Polygamy in the United States
Women in Utah
Mormonism and women